Romance 1600 is the second album by the singer-drummer-percussionist Sheila E. Prince contributed some backing vocals, guitar and bass guitar, and co-wrote/co-produced  "A Love Bizarre", a 12-minute epic that became a major hit in its edited radio-friendly form.

During her break, she had received a lot of media exposure, including appearing in the film Krush Groove, in which she performed "A Love Bizarre" and "Holly Rock". She had also performed for a wide audience as an act on Prince and The Revolution's Purple Rain Tour.

The video for the album's lead single, "Sister Fate", introduced a new image of the performer: a somewhat female-Prince influenced protégée. "Sister Fate"'s B-side had the cryptic protest song "Save the People". The album itself had many tracks that were personal and which help to support the embodiment of the thematic faux-French Renaissance episodic adventure that the lead single's video and the album art intended to set up for the listening audience. 

Although the album received mixed reviews, "A Love Bizarre" was the album's most successful single. On January 28, 1986, the album was certified Gold by the RIAA.

Track listing

Personnel

Sheila E. – lead vocals, percussion, drums, strings, bass guitar, keyboards, arranger, producer, writer
Juan Escovedo – percussion (tracks 3 and 8)
Eddie M. – background vocals (tracks 3 and 4); saxophone (tracks 1–4; 6–8)
Ken Grey – organ (track 1)
Stef Burns (Stephan Birnbaum) (It) – guitar (tracks 2 and 8), background vocals (tracks 3 and 4)
Karl Perazzo – bongos (track 6)
Prince – guitar, bass guitar (tracks 3 and 4); background vocals (tracks 3 and 5)
Micheal Weaver – background vocals (track 4)
Susie Davis – background vocals (tracks 2, 3, 6)
Benny Rietveld – background vocals (track 6)

Charts

Weekly charts

Year-end charts

References

1985 albums
Sheila E. albums
Albums produced by Prince (musician)
Paisley Park Records albums
Warner Records albums